Bhatvadar is a village in Lathi Taluka of Amreli district in Gujarat, India.

History
During British period, Bhatvadar was a separate tribute-paying taluka of the Babriavar district but it was later brought under Junagadh jurisdiction. It is about ten miles north of Jafarabad. The Grasias are Babrias of the
Varu tribe. The population according to the census of 1872 was eight and according to that of 1881 forty-six souls.

References 

 This article incorporates text from a publication now in the public domain: 

Princely states of Gujarat
Villages in Amreli district